Lieutenant-Colonel Gerard Evelyn Leachman, CIE, DSO (27 July 1880, Petersfield, Hampshire – 12 August 1920, Iraq) was an English soldier and intelligence officer who travelled extensively in Arabia.

Career
Leachman was commissioned a second lieutenant in the Royal Sussex Regiment on 20 January 1900, and the following month left with his battalion for service in South Africa during the Second Boer War. He served there until the end of the war, in June 1902, and left Cape Town in the SS Bavarian in August, returning to Southampton the following month. He later served in India, but spent most of his career as a political officer in Mesopotamia, where he was instrumental in pacifying warring tribes to bring stability to the new country. Leachman also made various expeditions further south into Arabia, where he contacted Ibn Sa'ud on behalf of the British government. He travelled as a naturalist of the Royal Geographical Society, but was in fact a British agent.

With his dark, Semitic looks and skill at riding a camel, Leachman was easily able to pass as Bedouin and often travelled incognito.

Leachman's first major expedition south into the Arabian Peninsula was in 1909, during which he was involved in a ferocious battle between the Anaiza and Shammar tribes near Ha'il. He was awarded Macgregor Memorial medal for reconnaissance in 1910. In 1912 Leachman made a second expedition with the intention of crossing the Rub Al Khali, but was refused permission by Ibn Sa'ud when he reached Riyadh and instead went to Hasa. He was the first Briton to be received by Ibn Sa'ud in his home city.

In December, 1915, during the Siege of Kut, the British commanding officer, Major General Charles Townshend, ordered Leachman to save the British cavalry by breaking out and riding south. This he did and the cavalry were the only British unit to escape before the fall of the city to the Ottomans.

Leachman was close to Gertrude Bell's friend Fahad Bey Ibn Haddal, chief of the Amarat Bedouins and fought with the Muntafiq Bedouin federation. The Bedouin called him Njayman.

Prior to the conclusion of the war, Leachman was assigned to the 17th Division, which was assigned the task of operating on both the left and right banks of the Tigris in an effort to advance north in order to secure as much territory from the Ottomans prior to the now inevitable surrender of the Ottoman Empire. Leachman was specifically assigned to Light Armoured Motor Brigade on the right bank of the Tigris, ostensibly with a special task to work with local tribes.

Death
After the war, he was assigned as Political Officer for the Mosul Division within Mesopotamia, up until October, 1919. He was murdered during the 1920 insurrection by a son of Dhari ibn Mahmoud, leader of the Zoba tribe of the Shammar confederation, in Abu Ghraib near Fallujah on 12 August 1920. The episode is famous in Bedouin oral lore. Leachman had visited Dhari in an effort to renegotiate repayment of advances made to him by the government and to persuade him to remain loyal to the current administration, but was shot in the back by Dhari's son after a verbal disagreement over a local robbery. Leachman's death sparked an immediate outbreak of tribal uprisings on the Euphrates between Falluja and Hit, and was responsible for General Haldane's advance on the same area in September, 1920. He was buried in the British Military Cemetery in Baghdad.

He was played by Oliver Reed in Al-Mas' Ala Al-Kubra (aka Clash of Loyalties), a 1983 film financed by Saddam Hussein, which was nominated for the Golden Prize at the 1983 Moscow International Film Festival.

References

Further reading
 A Paladin of Arabia. The Biography of Brevet Lieut.-Colonel G. E. Leachman, N.N.E.Bray, Unicorn Press (1936). 
 Travellers in Arabia, Eid Al Yahya, Stacey International (2006).  (9780955219313)
 OC Desert; The Life of Lieutenant-Colonel Gerard Leachman, H.V.F. Winstone, Quartet (1982). 
 Hay, W.R. Two Years in Kurdistan: Experiences of a Political Officer 1918–1920. London: Sidgwick & Jackson, Ltd., 1921.
 Wilson, Sir Arnold. Mesopotamia 1917-1920: A Clash of Loyalties. London: Oxford University Press, 1931.

External links
 Colonel Gerard Leachman: Iraq 1920

1880 births
1920 deaths
Royal Sussex Regiment officers
British Army personnel of the Second Boer War
English explorers
English people murdered abroad
Explorers of Asia
Explorers of Arabia
World War I spies for the United Kingdom
People murdered in Iraq
Male murder victims
Recipients of the MacGregor Medal
Deaths by firearm in Iraq